Sean Davey (born 8 April 1993) is a New Zealand cricketer. He made his Twenty20 debut for Northern Districts in the 2017–18 Super Smash on 2 January 2018. Prior to his Twenty20 debut, he was part of New Zealand's squad for the 2012 Under-19 Cricket World Cup. He made his first-class debut on 5 November 2020, for Canterbury in the 2020–21 Plunket Shield season. He made his List A debut on 29 November 2020, for Canterbury in the 2020–21 Ford Trophy, taking his first five-wicket haul in List A cricket with 6-30.

References

External links
 

1993 births
Living people
New Zealand cricketers
Sportspeople from Tauranga
Canterbury cricketers
Northern Districts cricketers